Kenoma is an unincorporated community in Barton County, Missouri, United States. It is located six miles southeast of Lamar.

History
The community was founded in 1880. The origin of the name Kenoma is obscure. A post office called Kenoma was established in 1881, and remained in operation until 1980.

References

Unincorporated communities in Barton County, Missouri
Populated places established in 1884
Unincorporated communities in Missouri
1884 establishments in Missouri